Phil Sharpe may refer to:
Phil Sharpe (cricketer) (1936 - 2014), English cricketer
Phil Sharpe (footballer) (born 1968), English footballer and football manager
Phil Sharpe (Hollyoaks), a character from the British TV series Hollyoaks

See also
 Philip Sharp (disambiguation)